The Archdiocese of Daegu (previously known as Taiku or Taegu) is a particular church of the Latin Church of the Catholic Church. The Archbishop of Daegu, whose seat is at Kyesan Cathedral in Daegu, is Metropolitan bishop for the Dioceses of Andong, Cheongju, Masan, and Busan.

It is the second oldest episcopal see in Korea, erected as an apostolic vicariate on April 8, 1911, from the Apostolic Vicariate of Korea. It was elevated to archdiocesan status on March 10, 1962.

Leadership

Ordinaries

Apostolic Vicars of Taiku
Florian-Jean-Baptiste Démange (1911–1938)
Jean-Germain Mousset, M.E.P. (1938–1942)
Ireneus Hayasaka Kyubei (1942–1946)
Paul Chu Jae-yong (1946–1948)
Paul Roh Ki-nam (1948; apostolic administrator)
John Baptist Choi Deok-hong (1948–1954)
John Baptist Sye Bong-kil (1955–1962)

Archbishops of Daegu
John Baptist Sye Bong-kil (1962–1986)
Paul Ri Moun-hi (1986–2007)
John Choi Young-su (2007–2009)
Thaddeus Cho Hwan-Kil (2010–present)

Coadjutor Bishops
Paul Ri Moun-hi (1985–1986)
John Choi Young-su (2006–2007)

Auxiliary Bishops
Paul Ri Moun-hi (1972–1985)
Alexander Sye Cheong-duk (1994–2001)
John Choi Young-su (2000–2006)
Thaddeus Cho Hwan-gil (2007–2010)
John Bosco Chang Shin-ho (2016–present)

References

External links
Daegu Catholic Archdiocese official site 

Roman Catholic
Catholic Church in Korea
Roman Catholic dioceses in South Korea
Christian organizations established in 1911
Roman Catholic dioceses and prelatures established in the 20th century
A